El Artista del Año is a Peruvian competition television series that premiered on April 28, 2018, on América Televisión and produced under license by GV Producciones. The show is hosted by Gisela Valcárcel and Jaime "Choca" Mandros.

The format of the show consists of different celebrities who must demonstrate their skills in various artistic styles of singing, dancing and acting.

Cast

Hosts 
Gisela Valcárcel is the main host since the premiere of the show, along with Jaime "Choca" Mandros who is the co-host since the first season.

Judging panel 
The regular judges are the professional dancer Morella Petrozzi, the actor Lucho Cáceres, the actress and television presenter Fiorella Rodríguez and the criolla singer Cecilia Bracamonte. Other judges, most of them associated to the artistic world, have appeared as a guest judge or in substitution of one of the main judges, among them are Juan Carlos Fernández, Carlos Álvarez, Coco Marusix and Santi Lesmes.

Cast timeline 
Color key:

Seasons

El desafío 
Segment that presents a social case of urgent attention and a celebrity is invited to make a challenge, consisting of a presentation of dance, song or performance. In general, this participation will only have a few days of preparation and almost always, the chosen musical genres are those that the famous one does not know. What is sought is to sensitize the public so that donations of money or services are made to help people to whom the aid goes. A part of the results of the donations will be known at the end of the sequence and the rest, when opening the segment of the following week.

Special acts

References

External links 
 

Peruvian reality television series
América Televisión original programming
2018 Peruvian television series debuts
2010s Peruvian television series